Bayranshahr also known as Chaghalvandi (also Romanized as Chaghalvandī, Chaqalwandi, and Chaqalvandī; also known as Chagharvand and Chaqharvand) is a city in and capital of Bayravand District, in Khorramabad County, Lorestan Province, Iran. At the 2006 census, its population was 1,544, in 336 families.

Chaghalvandi was officially named Bayranshahr after the Beiranvand tribe in January 2012.

References

Towns and villages in Khorramabad County
Cities in Lorestan Province

Kurdish settlements in Iran